Maren Louise Käehne (born 7 November 1976) is a Danish screenwriter.

Käehne was born in Svendborg, Denmark and graduated from the Danish Film School in 2009. She has written various episodes of the acclaimed Danish dramas Borgen and The Bridge and cowrote Shelley (film).

References

External links 

 Maren Louise Käehne on IMDb
 Maren Louise Käehne on the Danish Film Institute

1976 births
Living people
People from Svendborg
Danish women screenwriters
Women television writers
Danish television writers
21st-century Danish writers
21st-century Danish women writers
21st-century Danish screenwriters